Selleola is a monotypic genus of flowering plants belonging to the family Caryophyllaceae. The only species is Selleola ekmaniana.

Its native range is Haiti.

References

Caryophyllaceae
Monotypic Caryophyllaceae genera